Tradicional (English Traditional) is the 19th studio album by Mexican pop singer, Ana Gabriel. It was released in 2004. This album goes from the regional styles of Mexican music to ska. It was nominated in the category of Best Ranchero Album in the Latin Grammy Awards of 2005, but lost to Luis Miguel's México en la Piel.

Track listing
Tracks:
 Con las Alas Atadas (Huapango) 03:18
 La Araña (Ranchera) 03:14
 Volver, Volver (Bolero) 03:16
 Me Robaste el Amor (Bolero) 03:14
 Simón Blanco (Corrido) 03:13
 Que Te Vaya Bonito (Ranchera) 02:54
 Al Maestro Con Cariño (Norteño) 03:08
 Amarga Navidad (Ranchera) 02:59
 Peladito y a la Boca (Ska) 02:27
 Tú y las Nubes (Banda) 2:43
 Y Tú No Estás (Instrumental) 03:17

Album charts

 Note: This release reached the #20 position in Billboard Regional Mexican Albums staying for 1 week  and it reached the #30 position in the Billboard Top Latin Albums staying for 6 weeks in the chart.

References

2004 albums
Ana Gabriel albums